The Pakistani cricket team toured England in the 1996 English cricket season to play a three-match Test series against England.

Pakistan won the series 2-0 with 1 match drawn.

Test series summary

First Test

Second Test

Third Test

One Day Internationals (ODIs)

England won the Texaco Trophy 2-1.

1st ODI

2nd ODI

3rd ODI

References
 Playfair Cricket Annual 1997
 Wisden Cricketers' Almanack 1997

External links
 Pakistani cricket team in England and Scotland in 1996 at Cricinfo

1996 in cricket
1996 in English cricket
1996
International cricket competitions from 1994–95 to 1997